This is a list of the mammal species recorded in Tanzania. Of the mammal species in Tanzania, 2 are critically endangered, 13 are endangered, 19 are vulnerable, and 17 are near threatened.

The following tags are used to highlight each species' conservation status as assessed by the International Union for Conservation of Nature:

Some species were assessed using an earlier set of criteria. Species assessed using this system have the following instead of near threatened and least concern categories:

Order: Afrosoricida (tenrecs and golden moles) 
The order Afrosoricida contains the golden moles of southern Africa and the tenrecs of Madagascar and Africa, two families of small mammals that were traditionally part of the order Insectivora.

Family: Tenrecidae (tenrecs)
Subfamily: Potamogalinae
Genus: Potamogale
 Giant otter shrew, P. velox 
Family: Chrysochloridae
Subfamily: Chrysochlorinae
Genus: Chrysochloris
 Stuhlmann's golden mole, C. stuhlmanni

Order: Macroscelidea (elephant shrews) 
Often called sengis, the elephant shrews or jumping shrews are native to southern Africa. Their common English name derives from their elongated flexible snout and their resemblance to the true shrews.

Family: Macroscelididae (elephant-shrews)
Genus: Elephantulus
 Short-snouted elephant shrew, Elephantulus brachyrhynchus LC
 Rufous elephant shrew, Elephantulus rufescens LC
Genus: Petrodromus
 Four-toed elephant shrew, Petrodromus tetradactylus LC
Genus: Rhynchocyon
 Checkered elephant shrew, R. cirnei 
 Black and rufous elephant shrew, R. petersi 
 Grey-faced elephant shrew, R. udzungwensis

Order: Tubulidentata (aardvarks) 

The order Tubulidentata consists of a single species, the aardvark. Tubulidentata are characterised by their teeth which lack a pulp cavity and form thin tubes which are continuously worn down and replaced.

Family: Orycteropodidae
Genus: Orycteropus
 Aardvark, O. afer

Order: Hyracoidea (hyraxes) 

The hyraxes are any of four species of fairly small, thickset, herbivorous mammals in the order Hyracoidea. About the size of a domestic cat they are well-furred, with rounded bodies and a stumpy tail. They are native to Africa and the Middle East.

Family: Procaviidae (hyraxes)
Genus: Dendrohyrax
 Southern tree hyrax, Dendrohyrax arboreus 
Western tree hyrax, Dendrohyrax dorsalis 
Eastern tree hyrax, Dendrohyrax validus NT 
Genus: Heterohyrax
 Yellow-spotted rock hyrax, Heterohyrax brucei 
Genus: Procavia
 Cape hyrax, Procavia capensis

Order: Proboscidea (elephants) 

The elephants comprise three living species and are the largest living land animals.
Family: Elephantidae (elephants)
Genus: Loxodonta
African bush elephant, L. africana

Order: Sirenia (manatees and dugongs) 

Sirenia is an order of fully aquatic, herbivorous mammals that inhabit rivers, estuaries, coastal marine waters, swamps, and marine wetlands. All four species are endangered.

Family: Dugongidae
Genus: Dugong
 Dugong, D. dugon

Order: Primates 

The order Primates contains humans and their closest relatives: lemurs, lorisoids, tarsiers, monkeys, and apes.

Suborder: Strepsirrhini
Infraorder: Lemuriformes
Superfamily: Lorisoidea
Family: Galagidae
Genus: Galagoides
 Grant's bushbaby, Galagoides granti DD
 Uluguru bushbaby, Galagoides orinus DD
 Rondo dwarf galago, Galagoides rondoensis EN
 Thomas's bushbaby, Galagoides thomasi LR/lc
 Zanzibar bushbaby, Galagoides zanzibaricus LR/nt
 Prince Demidoff's bushbaby, Galagoides demidovii LR/lc
Genus: Galago
 Mohol bushbaby, Galago moholi LR/lc
 Senegal bushbaby, Galago senegalensis LR/lc
Genus: Otolemur
 Brown greater galago, Otolemur crassicaudatus LR/lc
 Northern greater galago, Otolemur garnettii LR/lc
Suborder: Haplorhini
Infraorder: Simiiformes
Parvorder: Catarrhini
Superfamily: Cercopithecoidea
Family: Cercopithecidae (Old World monkeys)
Genus: Erythrocebus
 Patas monkey, Erythrocebus patas LR/lc
Genus: Chlorocebus
 Vervet monkey, Chlorocebus pygerythrus LR/lc
Genus: Cercopithecus
 Red-tailed monkey, Cercopithecus ascanius LR/lc
 Blue monkey, Cercopithecus mitis LR/lc
Genus: Lophocebus
 Grey-cheeked mangabey, Lophocebus albigena LR/lc
Genus: Papio
 Olive baboon, Papio anubis LR/lc
 Yellow baboon, Papio cynocephalus LR/lc
Genus: Cercocebus
 Crested mangabey, Cercocebus galeritus LR/nt
Subfamily: Colobinae
Genus: Colobus
 Angola colobus, Colobus angolensis LR/lc
 Mantled guereza, Colobus guereza LR/lc
Genus: Procolobus
 Udzungwa red colobus, Procolobus gordonorum VU
 Zanzibar red colobus, Procolobus kirkii EN
Superfamily: Hominoidea
Family: Hominidae
Subfamily: Homininae
Tribe: Panini
Genus: Pan
 Common chimpanzee, P. troglodytes EN
Eastern chimpanzee, P. t. schweinfurthii EN

Order: Rodentia (rodents) 

Rodents make up the largest order of mammals, with over 40% of mammalian species. They have two incisors in the upper and lower jaw which grow continually and must be kept short by gnawing.

Suborder: Hystricognathi
Family: Bathyergidae
Genus: Cryptomys
 Common mole-rat, Cryptomys hottentotus LC
Genus: Heliophobius
 Silvery mole-rat, Heliophobius argenteocinereus LC
Family: Hystricidae (Old World porcupines)
Genus: Atherurus
 African brush-tailed porcupine, Atherurus africanus LC
Genus: Hystrix
 Cape porcupine, Hystrix africaeaustralis LC
 Crested porcupine, Hystrix cristata LC
Family: Thryonomyidae (cane rats)
Genus: Thryonomys
 Lesser cane rat, Thryonomys gregorianus LC
 Greater cane rat, Thryonomys swinderianus LC
Suborder: Sciurognathi
Family: Anomaluridae
Subfamily: Anomalurinae
Genus: Anomalurus
 Lord Derby's scaly-tailed squirrel, Anomalurus derbianus LC
Subfamily: Zenkerellinae
Genus: Idiurus
 Long-eared flying mouse, Idiurus macrotis LC
Family: Pedetidae (spring hare)
Genus: Pedetes
 Springhare, Pedetes surdaster LC
Family: Sciuridae (squirrels)
Subfamily: Xerinae
Tribe: Xerini
Genus: Xerus
 Striped ground squirrel, Xerus erythropus LC
 Unstriped ground squirrel, Xerus rutilus LC
Tribe: Protoxerini
Genus: Heliosciurus
 Gambian sun squirrel, Heliosciurus gambianus LC
 Mutable sun squirrel, Heliosciurus mutabilis LC
 Red-legged sun squirrel, Heliosciurus rufobrachium LC
 Zanj sun squirrel, Heliosciurus undulatus DD
Genus: Paraxerus
 Boehm's bush squirrel, Paraxerus boehmi LC
 Smith's bush squirrel, Paraxerus cepapi LC
 Striped bush squirrel, Paraxerus flavovittis DD
 Black and red bush squirrel, Paraxerus lucifer DD
 Ochre bush squirrel, Paraxerus ochraceus LC
 Red bush squirrel, Paraxerus palliatus LC
 Swynnerton's bush squirrel, Paraxerus vexillarius VU
Genus: Protoxerus
 Forest giant squirrel, Protoxerus stangeri LC
Family: Gliridae (dormice)
Subfamily: Graphiurinae
Genus: Graphiurus
 Lorrain dormouse, Graphiurus lorraineus LC
 Small-eared dormouse, Graphiurus microtis LC
 Kellen's dormouse, Graphiurus kelleni LC
Family: Spalacidae
Subfamily: Tachyoryctinae
Genus: Tachyoryctes
 Demon African mole-rat, Tachyoryctes daemon LC
Family: Nesomyidae
Subfamily: Dendromurinae
Genus: Dendromus
 Montane African climbing mouse, Dendromus insignis LC
 Gray climbing mouse, Dendromus melanotis LC
 Brants's climbing mouse, Dendromus mesomelas LC
 Chestnut climbing mouse, Dendromus mystacalis LC
 Nyika climbing mouse, Dendromus nyikae LC
Genus: Steatomys
 Tiny fat mouse, Steatomys parvus LC
 Fat mouse, Steatomys pratensis LC
Subfamily: Cricetomyinae
Genus: Beamys
 Lesser hamster-rat, Beamys hindei NT
 Greater hamster-rat, Beamys major NT
Genus: Cricetomys
 Emin's pouched rat, Cricetomys emini LC
 Gambian pouched rat, Cricetomys gambianus LC
Genus: Saccostomus
 South African pouched mouse, Saccostomus campestris LC
 Mearns's pouched mouse, Saccostomus mearnsi LC
Family: Cricetidae
Subfamily: Lophiomyinae
Genus: Lophiomys
 Maned rat, Lophiomys imhausi LC
Family: Muridae (mice, rats, voles, gerbils, hamsters, etc.)
Subfamily: Deomyinae
Genus: Acomys
 Fiery spiny mouse, Acomys ignitus LC
 Kemp's spiny mouse, Acomys kempi LC
 Spiny mouse, Acomys spinosissimus LC
 Wilson's spiny mouse, Acomys wilsoni LC
Genus: Lophuromys
 Yellow-spotted brush-furred rat, Lophuromys flavopunctatus LC
 Rusty-bellied brush-furred rat, Lophuromys sikapusi LC
Subfamily: Otomyinae
Genus: Otomys
 Angoni vlei rat, Otomys angoniensis LC
 Dent's vlei rat, Otomys denti NT
 Tanzanian vlei rat, Otomys lacustris NT
 Afroalpine vlei rat, Otomys orestes DD
 Uzungwe vlei rat, Otomys uzungwensis EN
Subfamily: Gerbillinae
Genus: Gerbillus
 Harwood's gerbil, Gerbillus harwoodi LC
 Least gerbil, Gerbillus pusillus LC
Genus: Tatera
 Boehm's gerbil, Tatera boehmi LC
 Gorongoza gerbil, Tatera inclusa LC
 Bushveld gerbil, Tatera leucogaster LC
 Black-tailed gerbil, Tatera nigricauda LC
 Fringe-tailed gerbil, Tatera robusta LC
 Savanna gerbil, Tatera valida LC
Genus: Taterillus
 Harrington's gerbil, Taterillus harringtoni LC
Subfamily: Murinae
Genus: Aethomys
 Red rock rat, Aethomys chrysophilus LC
 Hinde's rock rat, Aethomys hindei LC
 Kaiser's rock rat, Aethomys kaiseri LC
Genus: Arvicanthis
 Nairobi grass rat, Arvicanthis nairobae LC
 African grass rat, Arvicanthis niloticus LC
 Neumann's grass rat, Arvicanthis neumanni DD
Genus: Dasymys
 African marsh rat, Dasymys incomtus LC
Genus: Grammomys
 Woodland thicket rat, Grammomys dolichurus LC
 Ruwenzori thicket rat, Grammomys ibeanus LC
 Macmillan's thicket rat, Grammomys macmillani LC
Genus: Hylomyscus
 Montane wood mouse, Hylomyscus denniae LC
 Stella wood mouse, Hylomyscus stella LC
Genus: Lemniscomys
 Single-striped grass mouse, Lemniscomys rosalia LC
 Typical striped grass mouse, Lemniscomys striatus LC
 Heuglin's striped grass mouse, Lemniscomys zebra LC
Genus: Mastomys
 Natal multimammate mouse, Mastomys natalensis LC
 Dwarf multimammate mouse, Mastomys pernanus DD
Genus: Mus
 African pygmy mouse, Mus minutoides LC
 Neave's mouse, Mus neavei DD
 Thomas's pygmy mouse, Mus sorella LC
 Delicate mouse, Mus tenellus LC
 Gray-bellied pygmy mouse, Mus triton LC
Genus: Mylomys
 African groove-toothed rat, Mylomys dybowskii LC
Genus: Myomyscus
 Brockman's rock mouse, Myomyscus brockmani LC
Genus: Oenomys
 Common rufous-nosed rat, Oenomys hypoxanthus LC
Genus: Pelomys
 Creek groove-toothed swamp rat, Pelomys fallax LC
 Hopkins's groove-toothed swamp rat, Pelomys hopkinsi VU
 Least groove-toothed swamp rat, Pelomys minor LC
Genus: Praomys
 Delectable soft-furred mouse, Praomys delectorum NT
 Jackson's soft-furred mouse, Praomys jacksoni LC
Genus: Rhabdomys
 Four-striped grass mouse, Rhabdomys pumilio LC
Genus: Thallomys
 Loring's rat, Thallomys loringi LC
 Acacia rat, Thallomys paedulcus LC
Genus: Zelotomys
 Hildegarde's broad-headed mouse, Zelotomys hildegardeae LC

Order: Lagomorpha (lagomorphs) 
The lagomorphs comprise two families, Leporidae (hares and rabbits), and Ochotonidae (pikas). Though they can resemble rodents, and were classified as a superfamily in that order until the early 20th century, they have since been considered a separate order. They differ from rodents in a number of physical characteristics, such as having four incisors in the upper jaw rather than two.

Family: Leporidae (rabbits, hares)
Genus: Pronolagus
 Smith's red rock hare, Pronolagus rupestris LR/lc
Genus: Lepus
 Cape hare, Lepus capensis LR/lc
 African savanna hare, Lepus microtis LR/lc

Order: Erinaceomorpha (hedgehogs and gymnures) 
The order Erinaceomorpha contains a single family, Erinaceidae, which comprise the hedgehogs and gymnures. The hedgehogs are easily recognised by their spines while gymnures look more like large rats.

Family: Erinaceidae (hedgehogs)
Subfamily: Erinaceinae
Genus: Atelerix
 Four-toed hedgehog, Atelerix albiventris LR/lc

Order: Soricomorpha (shrews, moles, and solenodons) 
The "shrew-forms" are insectivorous mammals. The shrews and solenodons closely resemble mice while the moles are stout-bodied burrowers.

Family: Soricidae (shrews)
Subfamily: Crocidurinae
Genus: Crocidura
 East African highland shrew, Crocidura allex LC
 Reddish-gray musk shrew, Crocidura cyanea LC
 Desperate shrew, Crocidura desperata EN
 Elgon shrew, Crocidura elgonius LC
 Fischer's shrew, Crocidura fischeri DD
 Bicolored musk shrew, Crocidura fuscomurina LC
 Peters's musk shrew, Crocidura gracilipes DD
 Hildegarde's shrew, Crocidura hildegardeae LC
 Lesser red musk shrew, Crocidura hirta LC
 Moonshine shrew, Crocidura luna LC
 Kilimanjaro shrew, Crocidura monax DD
 Montane white-toothed shrew, Crocidura montis LC
 Savanna dwarf shrew, Crocidura nanilla LC
 African giant shrew, Crocidura olivieri LC
 Small-footed shrew, Crocidura parvipes LC
 Roosevelt's shrew, Crocidura roosevelti LC
 Lesser gray-brown musk shrew, Crocidura silacea LC
 Tanzanian shrew, Crocidura tansaniana VU
 Telford's shrew, Crocidura telfordi EN
 Turbo shrew, Crocidura turba LC
 Usambara shrew, Crocidura usambarae EN
 Xanthippe's shrew, Crocidura xantippe LC
Genus: Suncus
 Least dwarf shrew, Suncus infinitesimus LC
 Greater dwarf shrew, Suncus lixus LC
 Lesser dwarf shrew, Suncus varilla LC
Genus: Sylvisorex
 Grant's forest shrew, Sylvisorex granti LC
 Howell's forest shrew, Sylvisorex howelli VU
 Johnston's forest shrew, Sylvisorex johnstoni LC
 Climbing shrew, Sylvisorex megalura LC
Subfamily: Myosoricinae
Genus: Myosorex
 Geata mouse shrew, Myosorex geata DD
 Kihaule's mouse shrew, Myosorex kihaulei EN
 Kilimanjaro mouse shrew, Myosorex zinki VU

Order: Chiroptera (bats) 
Bats are unique among the mammals in that they are capable of sustained flight. Bats are instantly recognisable by the presence of a flight membrane which stretches between elongated bones in the hand and wrist forming the wing structure. Whilst we do not tend to think of bats as a "typical mammal", bats account for over 20% of all mammals species. Their extensive radiation and great diversity can be attributed to the evolutionary innovation of flight.
Family: Pteropodidae (flying foxes, Old World fruit bats)
Subfamily: Pteropodinae
Genus: Eidolon
 Straw-coloured fruit bat, Eidolon helvum LC
Genus: Epomophorus
 Peters's epauletted fruit bat, Epomophorus crypturus LC
 Ethiopian epauletted fruit bat, Epomophorus labiatus LC
 East African epauletted fruit bat, Epomophorus minimus LC
 Wahlberg's epauletted fruit bat, Epomophorus wahlbergi LC
Genus: Epomops
 Dobson's epauletted fruit bat, Epomops dobsoni LC
 Franquet's epauletted fruit bat, Epomops franqueti LC
Genus: Lissonycteris
 Angolan rousette, Lissonycteris angolensis LC
Genus: Micropteropus
 Peters's dwarf epauletted fruit bat, Micropteropus pusillus LC
Genus: Myonycteris
 East African little collared fruit bat, Myonycteris relicta VU
Genus: Pteropus
 Seychelles fruit bat, Pteropus seychellensis LC
 Pemba flying fox, Pteropus voeltzkowi VU
Genus: Rousettus
 Egyptian fruit bat, Rousettus aegyptiacus LC
 Long-haired rousette, Rousettus lanosus LC
Family: Vespertilionidae
Subfamily: Kerivoulinae
Genus: Kerivoula
 Tanzanian woolly bat, Kerivoula africana EN
 Damara woolly bat, Kerivoula argentata LC
 Lesser woolly bat, Kerivoula lanosa LC
Subfamily: Myotinae
Genus: Myotis
 Rufous mouse-eared bat, Myotis bocagii LC
 Cape hairy bat, Myotis tricolor LC
 Welwitsch's bat, Myotis welwitschii LC
Subfamily: Vespertilioninae
Genus: Glauconycteris
 Silvered bat, Glauconycteris argentata LC
 Butterfly bat, Glauconycteris variegata LC
Genus: Laephotis
 Botswanan long-eared bat, Laephotis botswanae LC
 De Winton's long-eared bat, Laephotis wintoni LC
Genus: Mimetillus
 Moloney's mimic bat, Mimetillus moloneyi LC
Genus: Neoromicia
 Cape serotine, Neoromicia capensis LC
 Heller's pipistrelle, Neoromicia helios DD
 Melck's house bat, Neoromicia melckorum DD
 Banana pipistrelle, Neoromicia nanus LC
 Rendall's serotine, Neoromicia rendalli LC
 Somali Serotine, Neoromicia somalicus LC
 White-winged serotine, Neoromicia tenuipinnis LC
Genus: Nycticeinops
 Schlieffen's bat, Nycticeinops schlieffeni LC
Genus: Pipistrellus
 Dar es Salaam pipistrelle, Pipistrellus permixtus DD
 Rüppell's pipistrelle, Pipistrellus rueppelli LC
 Rusty pipistrelle, Pipistrellus rusticus LC
Genus: Scotoecus
 Light-winged lesser house bat, Scotoecus albofuscus DD
 Hinde's lesser house bat, Scotoecus hindei DD
 Dark-winged lesser house bat, Scotoecus hirundo DD
Genus: Scotophilus
 African yellow bat, Scotophilus dinganii LC
 Schreber's yellow bat, Scotophilus nigrita NT
 Greenish yellow bat, Scotophilus viridis LC
Subfamily: Miniopterinae
Genus: Miniopterus
 Greater long-fingered bat, Miniopterus inflatus LC
 Least long-fingered bat, Miniopterus minor NT
 Natal long-fingered bat, Miniopterus natalensis NT
Family: Molossidae
Genus: Chaerephon
 Gland-tailed free-tailed bat, Chaerephon bemmeleni LC
 Spotted free-tailed bat, Chaerephon bivittata LC
 Lappet-eared free-tailed bat, Chaerephon major LC
 Nigerian free-tailed bat, Chaerephon nigeriae LC
 Little free-tailed bat, Chaerephon pumila LC
Genus: Mops
 Sierra Leone free-tailed bat, Mops brachypterus LC
 Angolan free-tailed bat, Mops condylurus LC
 Midas free-tailed bat, Mops midas LC
Genus: Otomops
 Large-eared free-tailed bat, Otomops martiensseni NT
Genus: Tadarida
 Egyptian free-tailed bat, Tadarida aegyptiaca LC
 Madagascan large free-tailed bat, Tadarida fulminans LC
 African giant free-tailed bat, Tadarida ventralis NT
Family: Emballonuridae
Genus: Coleura
 African sheath-tailed bat, Coleura afra LC
Genus: Taphozous
 Hamilton's tomb bat, Taphozous hamiltoni NT
 Hildegarde's tomb bat, Taphozous hildegardeae VU
 Mauritian tomb bat, Taphozous mauritianus LC
 Naked-rumped tomb bat, Taphozous nudiventris LC
 Egyptian tomb bat, Taphozous perforatus LC
Family: Nycteridae
Genus: Nycteris
 Bate's slit-faced bat, Nycteris arge LC
 Andersen's slit-faced bat,  Nycteris aurita DD
 Large slit-faced bat, Nycteris grandis LC
 Hairy slit-faced bat, Nycteris hispida LC
 Intermediate slit-faced bat, Nycteris intermedia NT
 Large-eared slit-faced bat, Nycteris macrotis LC
 Dwarf slit-faced bat, Nycteris nana LC
 Egyptian slit-faced bat, Nycteris thebaica LC
 Wood's slit-faced bat, Nycteris woodi NT
Family: Megadermatidae
Genus: Cardioderma
 Heart-nosed bat, Cardioderma cor LC
Genus: Lavia
 Yellow-winged bat, Lavia frons LC
Family: Rhinolophidae
Subfamily: Rhinolophinae
Genus: Rhinolophus
Blasius's horseshoe bat, R. blasii 
 Geoffroy's horseshoe bat, Rhinolophus clivosus LC
 Darling's horseshoe bat, Rhinolophus darlingi LC
 Decken's horseshoe bat, Rhinolophus deckenii DD
 Eloquent horseshoe bat, Rhinolophus eloquens DD
 Rüppell's horseshoe bat, Rhinolophus fumigatus LC
 Hildebrandt's horseshoe bat, Rhinolophus hildebrandti LC
 Lander's horseshoe bat, Rhinolophus landeri LC
 Maendeleo horseshoe bat, Rhinolophus maendeleo DD
 Bushveld horseshoe bat, Rhinolophus simulator LC
 Swinny's horseshoe bat, Rhinolophus swinnyi NT
Subfamily: Hipposiderinae
Genus: Asellia
 Trident leaf-nosed bat, Asellia tridens LC
Genus: Cloeotis
 Percival's trident bat, Cloeotis percivali VU
Genus: Hipposideros
 Sundevall's roundleaf bat, Hipposideros caffer LC
 Cyclops roundleaf bat, Hipposideros cyclops LC
 Giant roundleaf bat, Hipposideros gigas LC
 Commerson's roundleaf bat, Hipposideros marungensis NT
 Noack's roundleaf bat, Hipposideros ruber LC
Genus: Triaenops
 Persian trident bat, Triaenops persicus LC

Order: Pholidota (pangolins) 
The order Pholidota comprises the eight species of pangolin. Pangolins are anteaters and have the powerful claws, elongated snout and long tongue seen in the other unrelated anteater species. 

Family: Manidae
Genus: Manis 
 Giant pangolin, Manis gigantea LR/lc 
 Ground pangolin, Manis temminckii LR/nt
 Tree pangolin, Manis tricuspis LR/lc

Order: Cetacea (whales) 

The order Cetacea includes whales, dolphins and porpoises. They are the mammals most fully adapted to aquatic life with a spindle-shaped nearly hairless body, protected by a thick layer of blubber, and forelimbs and tail modified to provide propulsion underwater.

Suborder: Mysticeti
Family: Balaenopteridae
Subfamily: Balaenopterinae
Genus: Balaenoptera
 Common minke whale, Balaenoptera acutorostrata LC
 Sei whale, Balaenoptera borealis EN
 Bryde's whale, Balaenoptera edeni DD
 Blue whale, Balaenoptera musculus EN
 Fin whale, Balaenoptera physalus EN
Subfamily: Megapterinae
Genus: Megaptera
 Humpback whale, Megaptera novaeangliae VU
Suborder: Odontoceti
Superfamily: Platanistoidea
Family: Physeteridae
Genus: Physeter
 Sperm whale, Physeter macrocephalus VU
Family: Kogiidae
Genus: Kogia
 Pygmy sperm whale, Kogia breviceps LR/lc
 Dwarf sperm whale, Kogia sima LR/lc
Family: Ziphidae
Subfamily: Hyperoodontinae
Genus: Indopacetus
 Longman's beaked whale, Indopacetus pacificus DD
Genus: Ziphius
 Cuvier's beaked whale, Ziphius cavirostris DD
Genus: Mesoplodon
 Blainville's beaked whale, Mesoplodon densirostris DD
 Ginkgo-toothed beaked whale, Mesoplodon ginkgodens DD
Family: Delphinidae (marine dolphins)
Genus: Steno
 Rough-toothed dolphin, Steno bredanensis DD
Genus: Sousa
 Indian humpback dolphin, Sousa plumbea DD
Genus: Tursiops
 Indo-Pacific bottlenose dolphin, Tursiops aduncus DD
 Common bottlenose dolphin, Tursiops truncatus DD
Genus: Stenella
 Pantropical spotted dolphin, Stenella attenuata LR/cd
 Striped dolphin, Stenella coeruleoalba LR/cd
 Spinner dolphin, Stenella longirostris LR/cd
Genus: Lagenodelphis
 Fraser's dolphin, Lagenodelphis hosei DD
Genus: Grampus
 Risso's dolphin, Grampus griseus DD
Genus: Feresa
 Pygmy killer whale, Feresa attenuata DD
Genus: Pseudorca
 False killer whale, Pseudorca crassidens LR/lc
Genus: Orcinus
 Orca, Orcinus orca LR/cd
Genus: Globicephala
 Short-finned pilot whale, Globicephala macrorhynchus LR/cd
Genus: Peponocephala
 Melon-headed whale, Peponocephala electra DD

Order: Carnivora (carnivorans) 

Suborder: Feliformia
Family: Felidae (cats)
Subfamily: Felinae
Genus: Acinonyx
Cheetah, Acinonyx jubatus 
Genus: Caracal
Caracal, C. caracal 
Genus: Felis
African wildcat, F. lybica 
Genus: Leptailurus
Serval, L. serval 
Subfamily: Pantherinae
Genus: Panthera
Lion, P. leo 
Leopard, P. pardus 
African leopard, P. p. pardus
Zanzibar leopard, P. p. pardus, possibly 
Family: Viverridae
Subfamily: Viverrinae
Genus: Civettictis
African civet, C. civetta 
Genus: Genetta
 Angolan genet, Genetta angolensis LC
 Common genet, Genetta genetta LC
 Rusty-spotted genet, Genetta maculata LC
 Servaline genet, Genetta servalina LC
Family: Nandiniidae
Genus: Nandinia
 African palm civet, Nandinia binotata LC
Family: Herpestidae (mongooses)
Genus: Atilax
 Marsh mongoose, Atilax paludinosus LC
Genus: Bdeogale
Bushy-tailed mongoose, B. crassicauda 
 Jackson's mongoose, Bdeogale jacksoni VU
Genus: Helogale
 Common dwarf mongoose, Helogale parvula LC
Genus: Herpestes
 Egyptian mongoose, Herpestes ichneumon LC
Common slender mongoose, Herpestes sanguinea LC
Genus: Mungos
 Banded mongoose, Mungos mungo LClc
Genus: Rhynchogale
 Meller's mongoose, Rhynchogale melleri LC
Genus: Urva
Small Indian mongoose, Urva auropunctata  introduced
Genus: Xenogale
Long-nosed mongoose, Xenogale naso LC
Family: Hyaenidae (hyaenas)
Genus: Crocuta
 Spotted hyena, Crocuta crocuta LC
Genus: Hyaena
 Striped hyena, Hyaena hyaena NT
Genus: Proteles
 Aardwolf, Proteles cristatus LC
Suborder: Caniformia
Family: Canidae (dogs, foxes)
Genus: Canis
 African golden wolf, Canis lupaster LC
Genus: Lupulella
 Side-striped jackal, L. adusta 
 Black-backed jackal, L. mesomelas 
Genus: Otocyon
 Bat-eared fox, Otocyon megalotis LC
Genus: Lycaon
 African wild dog, Lycaon pictus EN
Family: Mustelidae (mustelids)
Genus: Ictonyx
 Striped polecat, Ictonyx striatus LC
Genus: Poecilogale
 African striped weasel, Poecilogale albinucha LC
Genus: Mellivora
 Honey badger, Mellivora capensis LC
Genus: Hydrictis
 Speckle-throated otter, Hydrictis maculicollis LC
Genus: Aonyx
 African clawless otter, Aonyx capensis LC

Order: Perissodactyla (odd-toed ungulates) 

The odd-toed ungulates are browsing and grazing mammals. They are usually large to very large, and have relatively simple stomachs and a large middle toe.

Family: Equidae (horses etc.)
Genus: Equus
 Plains zebra, Equus quagga NT
Family: Rhinocerotidae
Genus: Diceros 
Black rhinoceros, Diceros bicornis CR

Order: Artiodactyla (even-toed ungulates) 

The even-toed ungulates are ungulates whose weight is borne about equally by the third and fourth toes, rather than mostly or entirely by the third as in perissodactyls. There are about 220 artiodactyl species, including many that are of great economic importance to humans.
Family: Suidae (pigs)
Subfamily: Phacochoerinae
Genus: Phacochoerus
 Common warthog, Phacochoerus africanus LR/lc
Subfamily: Suinae
Genus: Hylochoerus
 Giant forest hog, Hylochoerus meinertzhageni LR/lc
Genus: Potamochoerus
 Bushpig, Potamochoerus larvatus LR/lc
Family: Hippopotamidae (hippopotamuses)
Genus: Hippopotamus
 Hippopotamus, Hippopotamus amphibius VU
Family: Giraffidae (giraffe, okapi)
Genus: Giraffa
 Masai giraffe, Giraffa tippelskirchi VU
Family: Bovidae (cattle, antelope, sheep, goats)
Subfamily: Alcelaphinae
Genus: Alcelaphus
Hartebeest, A. buselaphus 
 Lichtenstein's hartebeest, Alcelaphus lichtensteinii LR/cd
Genus: Connochaetes
 Blue wildebeest, Connochaetes taurinus LR/cd
Genus: Damaliscus
 Topi, Damaliscus lunatus LR/cd
Subfamily: Antilopinae
Genus: Gazella
 Grant's gazelle, Gazella granti LR/cd
 Thomson's gazelle, Gazella thomsonii LR/cd
Genus: Litocranius
 Gerenuk, Litocranius walleri LR/cd
Genus: Madoqua
 Kirk's dik-dik, Madoqua kirkii LR/lc
Genus: Neotragus
 Suni, Neotragus moschatus LR/cd
Genus: Oreotragus
 Klipspringer, Oreotragus oreotragus LR/cd
Genus: Ourebia
 Oribi, Ourebia ourebi LR/cd
Genus: Raphicerus
 Steenbok, Raphicerus campestris LR/lc
 Sharpe's grysbok, Raphicerus sharpei LR/cd
Subfamily: Bovinae
Genus: Syncerus
African buffalo, S. caffer 
Genus: Tragelaphus
 Lesser kudu, Tragelaphus imberbis LR/cd
 Common eland, Tragelaphus oryx LR/cd
 Bushbuck, Tragelaphus scriptus LR/lc
 Sitatunga, Tragelaphus spekii LR/nt
 Greater kudu, Tragelaphus strepsiceros LR/cd
Subfamily: Cephalophinae
Genus: Cephalophus
 Aders's duiker, Cephalophus adersi CR
 Peters's duiker, Cephalophus callipygus LR/nt
 Harvey's duiker, Cephalophus harveyi LR/cd
 Blue duiker, Cephalophus monticola LR/lc
 Red forest duiker, Cephalophus natalensis LR/cd
 Abbott's duiker, Cephalophus spadix VU
 Weyns's duiker, Cephalophus weynsi LR/nt
Genus: Sylvicapra
 Common duiker, Sylvicapra grimmia LR/lc
Subfamily: Hippotraginae
Genus: Hippotragus
 Roan antelope, Hippotragus equinus LR/cd
 Sable antelope, Hippotragus niger LR/cd
Genus: Oryx
East African oryx, Oryx beisa RN
Subfamily: Aepycerotinae
Genus: Aepyceros
 Impala, Aepyceros melampus LR/cd
Subfamily: Reduncinae
Genus: Kobus
 Waterbuck, Kobus ellipsiprymnus LR/cd
 Kob, Kobus kob LR/cd
 Puku, Kobus vardonii LR/cd
Genus: Redunca
 Southern reedbuck, Redunca arundinum LR/cd
 Mountain reedbuck, Redunca fulvorufula LC
 Bohor reedbuck, Redunca redunca LR/cd

Notes

See also
List of chordate orders
Lists of mammals by region
List of prehistoric mammals
Mammal classification
List of mammals described in the 2000s

References

External links
Online key to mammals of Tanzania

Tanzania
Tanzania
Mammals